Michael Loew (May 8, 1907 — November 14, 1985) was an American Abstract Expressionist artist who was born in New York City.

Career
In the late 1920s, Loew studied at the Art Students League with the Ashcan School and was a recipient of a Sadie A. May Fellowship which allowed Loew to continue his studies in France. Michael worked for New Deal art projects from 1933–37 and during this time painted murals for U.S. post offices, high schools and the Hall of Pharmacy for the 1939 New York World's Fair. Loew chose to share his private commission with close friend and fellow artist, Willem de Kooning.

From 1939 to 1940 Loew traveled to Mexico and the Yucatán, gathering inspiration for his future work. Joining the U.S. Navy Seabees in 1943 as a Battalion Painter, Loew documented the work being done on the airbase on Tinian Island. It was from this airbase that the Enola Gay would later take off from to drop the atomic bombs. Loew captured much of the work done on the island by the Navy in dozens of watercolors.

Returning to New York after the war, having lost much of his hearing, Loew started over with his art studies. He studied with Hans Hofmann in New York and Provincetown, and with Fernand Léger in Paris. Loew became a member of the American Abstract Artists and The Artist's Club as well as The Spiral Group. His works were shown at the Stable Gallery Annuals of 1951–1955.

In 1960 and again in 1966, Loew was hired to teach at the University of California, Berkeley. He also spent nearly three decades as a teacher at the School of Visual Arts. In 1976 he won a fellowship grant from the National Endowment for the Arts and in 1979 he was awarded a grant from the Guggenheim Foundation.

Over the course of his life, Michael's work was exhibited extensively in galleries, museums and other cultural institutions including: The Solomon R. Guggenheim Museum, The Dallas Museum of Art, The Whitney Museum of American Art, The Philadelphia Museum of Art and The Hirshhorn Museum and Sculpture Garden. The Michael Loew Papers are located in the Archives of American Art at the Smithsonian Institution. His works have been exhibited in galleries including the Anita Shapolsky Gallery in New York City and the Thomas McCormick Gallery.

In 1997 his estate was awarded the Judith Rothschild Foundation Grant.

Teaching positions 
1958–1985 School of Visual Arts, New York City
1960, 1966 University of California, Berkeley

Awards and fellowships 
1964 Ford Foundation Purchase
1976 National Endowment for the Arts Fellowship Grant
1979 John Simon Guggenheim Memorial Foundation Fellowship
1997 Judith Rothschild Grant

Collections 
Whitney Museum of American Art
Solomon R. Guggenheim Museum
Gallatin Collection, Philadelphia Museum of Art
Hirshhorn Museum and Sculpture Garden
Carnegie Institute Museum of Art
Albright Knox Art Gallery
University of California, Berkeley
Portland Museum of Art
Dallas Museum of Fine Arts
Detroit Museum of Art
Wichita State University
Farnsworth Museum
Hampton University
Israel Museum
Monhegan Island Museum

References

Sources 
American Abstract Artists (1957). "The World of Abstract Art", pp. 167
Archives of American Art, Smithsonian Institution, Washington, D.C. 20560
Baur, J. (1974). Whitney Museum of American Art, Catalogue of the Collection, pp. 235
Campbell, L. (1984). "Michael Loew at Marilyn Pearl Gallery", Art in America, pp. 193
Curtis, J., Lieberman F. (1995). "Monhegan The Artists' Island"
Falk, Peter Hastings, (1999) Who Was Who in American Art, 1564–1975, 3 Volumes, pp. 3724
Gordon, J. (1962). "Geometric Abstraction in America", pp. 68
Herskovic M. (2000). New York School Abstract Expressionists Artists Choice by Artists, (New York School Press, 2000.) 
Kingsley, A. (1973). "New York Letter", Art International, Apr. 1973, pp. 52–53
Kingsley, A. (2008).  "Michael Loew 1907–1985: The Beginning Works from the Estate" (Chicago and New York: Mc Cormick Gallery/ Vincent Vallarino Fine Art, 2008)
Larsen, S. C. (1979). "A Painter's Geometry: The Art of Michael Loew", Arts Magazine, pp. 130–134
Larsen, Susan C (1997) "Michael Loew: Nature into Abstraction", The Farnsworth Art Museum
Slivka, Rose C.S. (1989). "Willem de Kooning", Art Journal 48 no. 3, Fall '89, pp. 219–221
Stevens, M., Swan, A. (2006). "De Kooning an American Master"
Stuart P. (1949). "Abstract Quartet", New York Times, November 27, 1949

External links 
biography
Artnet
Smithsonian Archives of American Art

1907 births
1985 deaths
Modern painters
Painters from New York City
20th-century American painters
American male painters
Abstract expressionist artists
Art Students League of New York alumni
American war artists
American muralists
Federal Art Project artists
National Endowment for the Arts Fellows
School of Visual Arts faculty
University of California, Berkeley College of Letters and Science faculty
Section of Painting and Sculpture artists
20th-century American male artists